The 1949 Bulgarian Cup was the 9th season of the Bulgarian Cup (in this period the tournament was named Cup of the Soviet Army). Levski Sofia won the competition, beating CSKA Sofia 2–1 in the 2nd replay after a 1–1 draw in the final and 2–2 draw in the 1st replay.

First round

|-
!colspan=3 style="background-color:#D0F0C0;" |3 April 1949

|-
!colspan="3" style="background-color:#D0F0C0; text-align=left"|Replay: 4 April 1949

|}

Quarter-finals

|-
!colspan=3 style="background-color:#D0F0C0;" |17 April 1949

|-
!colspan="3" style="background-color:#D0F0C0; text-align=left"|Replay: 18 April 1949

|}

Semi-finals

|-
!colspan=3 style="background-color:#D0F0C0;" |1 May 1949

|}

Final

First game

Second game

Third game

References

1949
1948–49 domestic association football cups
Cup